David Crosby Clark, Jr. (August 14, 1926 – December 24, 2015) was an American politician and attorney in the state of Florida.

Clark was born in Bad Axe, Michigan. He attended Central Michigan University and Stetson University Law School, becoming an attorney. He served in the Florida House of Representatives from 1968 to 1974, representing district 81. Clark also served on the North Palm Beach, Florida village council and as judge of the Palm Beach County Court. He was a member of the Republican party. He died in 2015.

References

2015 deaths
1926 births
Florida city council members
Florida state court judges
Republican Party members of the Florida House of Representatives
People from Bad Axe, Michigan
Central Michigan University alumni
Stetson University College of Law alumni
People from West Palm Beach, Florida
People from North Palm Beach, Florida
20th-century American judges